Binondo is a district in Manila and is referred to as the city's Chinatown. Its influence extends beyond to the places of Quiapo, Santa Cruz, San Nicolas and Tondo. It is the oldest Chinatown in the world, established in 1594 by the Spaniards as a settlement near Intramuros but across the Pasig River for Catholic Chinese, it was positioned so that colonial rulers could keep a close eye on their migrant subjects. It was already a hub of Chinese commerce even before the Spanish colonial period. Binondo is the center of commerce and trade of Manila, where all types of business run by Filipino-Chinese thrive.

Noted residents include Saint Lorenzo Ruiz, the Filipino protomartyr, and Venerable Mother Ignacia del Espiritu Santo, founder of the Congregation of the Religious of the Virgin Mary.

Etymology 
Numerous theories on the origin of the name "Binondo", and that of "Tondo", its neighboring district, have been put forward.  Philippine National Artist Nick Joaquin suggested that the names might have been derived from the archaic spelling of the Tagalog term "binondoc" (modern orthography: binundók), or mountainous, referring to Binondo's originally hilly terrain.  French linguist Jean-Paul Potet, however, has suggested that the river mangrove (Aegiceras corniculatum), which at the time was called "tundok" ("tinduk-tindukan" today), is the most likely origin of the term, with the 'Bi-" prefix in "Binondo" indicating Binondo's location relative to Tondo.

History 

Founded in 1594, Binondo was created by Spanish Governor Luis Pérez Dasmariñas as a permanent settlement for Chinese immigrants (the Spanish called the Chinese sangleys) who converted to Catholicism. It was across the river from the walled city of Intramuros, where the Spaniards resided. Originally it was intended to replace the Parian near Intramuros, where the Chinese were first confined. The Spanish gave a land grant for Binondo to a group of Chinese merchants and artisans in perpetuity, tax-free and with limited self-governing privileges.

The Spanish Dominican fathers made Binondo their parish and succeeded in converting many of the residents to Catholicism. Binondo soon became the place where Chinese immigrants converted to Catholicism, intermarried with indigenous Filipino women and had children, who became the Chinese mestizo community. Over the years, the Chinese mestizo population of Binondo grew rapidly. This was caused mainly because the lack of Chinese immigrant females and the Spanish officials' policy of expelling or killing (in conflicts) Chinese immigrants who refused to convert.

In 1603 a Chinese revolt took place led by Juan Suntay, a wealthy Catholic Chinese. It was put down by joint Spanish and Filipino forces led by Luis Pérez Dasmariñas. In the aftermath most of the 20,000 Chinese that composed the colony were killed. The revolt took place right after a visit to Manila by three official Chinese representatives who disclosed they were searching for "a mountain of gold". This strange claim prompted the Spanish to conclude that there was an imminent invasion from China in the making. At the time the local Chinese outnumbered the Spaniards by twenty to one, and Spanish authorities feared that they would join the invading forces. The Chinese afterward played down those events in an attempt to preserve their commercial interests. In 1605 a Fukien official issued a letter claiming that the Chinese who had participated in the revolt were unworthy of China's protection, describing them as "deserters of the tombs of their ancestors".

During the brief British occupation of Manila, between 1762 and 1764, Binondo was damaged during the capture of the city. The new governor of Manila, Dawsonne Drake, formed a war council which he termed the "Chottry Court". Drake imprisoned several Manilans on charges known "only known to himself", according Captain Thomas Backhouse, who denounced Drake's court as a sham.
Binondo became the main center for business and finance in Manila for the ethnic Chinese, Chinese mestizos and Spanish Filipinos. During the Spanish colonial period, many esteros (canals) were constructed in the Binondo area, from where they entered the Pasig River. Among the many who married at the historic Binondo Church was Andres Bonifacio in 1895, who became a hero of the Philippine Revolution.

Before World War II, Binondo was the centre of a banking and financial community which included insurance companies, commercial banks and other financial institutions from Britain and the United States. These banks were located mostly along Escólta, which used to be called the "Wall Street of the Philippines".

After the war and new development, most businesses began to relocate to the newer area of Makati. During the financial crisis of the early 1980s, it had the moniker "Binondo Central Bank", as the local Chinese businessmen engaged in massive black market trading of US dollars, which often determined the national peso-dollar exchange rate. Given its rich historical and financial significance, Binondo is said to have one of the highest land values nationwide.

Barangays
The most populated barangay in Binondo is Barangay 293.
Zone 27: 287, 288, 289, 290, 291
Zone 28: 292, 293, 294, 295, 296

Places of interest and events 

Plaza San Lorenzo Ruiz
Binondo Church
Escolta Street
Ongpin Street -Various Chinese Vendor Establishments and Chinese Commercial Space/building on the area. Several tea houses. restaurants, and hawker-style stalls that serve authentic dimsum and Chinese cuisine can be found along Ongpin Street. As such, this area has become popular as a gastronomic and cultural hotspot. Locals and tourists are known to embark on a what is called as a Binondo Food Crawl to sample the cuisine along Ongpin Street.
Chinese New Year
Lucky Chinatown Mall
Chinatown Arch
Jones Bridge

In literature
Binondo was mentioned several times in the novels of Dr. José Rizal, for example, in Noli Me Tangere and El Filibusterismo.

Gallery

See also
El Hogar Filipino Building
Juan Luna Building (next to El Hogar Building)
Davao Chinatown
Philippine Hokkien
Hokaglish
List of ethnic enclaves in Philippine cities

References

External links

 

 
Chinese-Filipino culture
Districts of Manila
Chinatowns in Asia
Central business districts in the Philippines